Ðukanović (Montenegrin and ; also transliterated  Djukanović) is a Serbo-Croatian surname. It is derived from the male given name "Đuka"/"Đukan", itself a variant of the name Đorđe (George). It is predominantly found in Serbia and Montenegro. It may refer to:

 Aco Đukanović (born 1965), Montenegrin businessman, brother of Milo
 Blažo Đukanović (1883–1943), Chetnik general and Montenegrin political leader
 Branislav Đukanović (born 1959), Montenegrin football player and manager
 Dragan Đukanović (born 1969), Montenegrin football player and manager
 Đukan Đukanović (born 1992), Serbian basketball player
 Goran Đukanović (born 1976), Montenegrin handball player
 Milo Đukanović (born 1962), Montenegrin politician, President
 Milutin Đukanović (born 1991), Montenegrin basketball player
 Pero Đukanović (1892–1986), Bosnian Serb World War II fighter
 Slaviša Đukanović (born 1979), Serbian handball player
 Srđan Đukanović (born 1980), Serbian footballer
 Vladimir Đukanović (born 1979), Serbian politician, lawyer and talk show host

See also
 Đukić
 Đokanović

Montenegrin surnames
Serbian surnames